Fred Estby (born 14 March 1972) is a Swedish drummer. He is best known as the drummer and main songwriter of the Swedish death metal band Dismember. Before he played drums in the band Carnage. Estby appeared in various other projects including The A-Bombs (drums), The Clint Eastwood Experience (drums), Daemon (vocals), and Shubniggurat (vocals), Dismemberizer (drums), Parodi (guitar), Death Breath (vocals). He has contributed vocals to the band Centinex of the album Subconscious Lobotomy. Estby also appeared as a guest singer of Entombed in 1997 during a show in Stockholm and sang "Left Hand Path".

After the release of 'The God That Never Was' and some touring, Fred Estby left the band "after long and careful consideration".  In a posting on the official site on April 20, 2007 Fred cites the demands of touring and the needs of his family as key reasons for him leaving the band.  Fred's statements appears as "My decision to put my family in first hand makes it impossible to keep on touring and commit to the band full time. I want to thank all the fans, friends, bands and all the other cool people i've met through the years and I wish Dismember all the best in the future. Fred."

Currently, Fred plays drums on the band The Dagger, a hard rock/heavy metal band from Stockholm, Sweden formed in 2009 by Fred Estby, David Blomqvist, Tobias Cristiansson and Jani Kataja. The Dagger has just released their first album through Century Media. In 2022, Estby joined the death metal band Ekstasis, which also includes vocalist Damien Moyal.

References

External links

1972 births
Living people
Swedish heavy metal drummers
Dismember (band) members
21st-century drummers
Carnage (band) members